Campus Martius Park is a re-established park in Downtown Detroit, Michigan. After the fire of 1805, Campus Martius (from the Latin for Field of Mars, where Roman heroes walked) was the focal point of Judge Augustus Woodward's plans to rebuild the city. It was named for the principal square in Marietta, Ohio, the first capital of the Northwest Territories.

Description

The park is located at the intersection of Woodward Avenue and Michigan Avenue, four blocks south of Grand Circus Park. The original park covered several acres and was a major gathering area for citizens. The park was lost in the 1900s as the city's downtown was reconfigured to accommodate increased vehicular traffic. Hart Plaza, along the riverfront, was designed to replace Campus Martius as a point of importance. But as Hart Plaza is a primarily hard-surfaced area, many residents came to lament the lack of true park space in the city's downtown area. This led to calls to rebuild Campus Martius, the site of the Civil War-era Michigan Soldiers' and Sailors' Monument, located across from the new Compuware Headquarters.

The point of origin is marked by a medallion embedded in the stone walkway. It is situated in the western point of the diamond surrounding the Woodward Fountain, just in front of the park's concession building.

The new Campus Martius Park was dedicated November 19, 2004 and includes two performance stages, sculptures, public spaces and a seasonal ice skating rink. At , the park is smaller than its predecessor, as a full restoration of the original would have required the demolition of several buildings. However, the city increased the amount of park space in the area by constructing the new Cadillac Square Park, which opened in summer 2007, immediately to the east of Campus Martius. The park's skating rink is designed to resemble the Rockefeller Center rink in New York City but is larger in size. Since its opening the rink has been operated by Magic Ice USA, Inc. Campus Martius Park is the home of the annual Motown Winter Blast, an event that has drawn more than 450,000 people to the downtown area every year and it has become the site of the city's annual Christmas tree lighting celebration, held the Monday before Thanksgiving. Thousands come to hear Christmas music and countdown to the lighting of the city's official Christmas tree and other decorations to mark the start of the holiday season.

Cadillac Square Park
Cadillac Square Park is another re-established park in the area. It lies immediately to the east of Campus Martius Park. Until 2001, the area where the park is located was occupied by a bus transfer station constructed in the 1960s. From 1841 until 1891, Cadillac Square was the site of the Detroit Farmer's Market.  The new park is site of the relocated Bagley Memorial Fountain which previously occupied a spot on Campus Martius.

In January 2008, the city of Detroit announced plans for a new Cadillac Centre, a $150 million mixed-use residential entertainment-retail complex attached to the Cadillac Tower. Designed by architect Anthony Caradonna and patterned after the Guggenheim Museum Bilbao, the contemporary steel and glass 24-story skyscraper complex to be located on Campus Martius Park, was planned to begin construction in the fall of 2009, but was indefinitely postponed by the city in October of that year when the developers failed to meet key agreements with the city.

The French sport of pétanque is played at Cadillac Square each workday from noon to 1 p.m. The similar Italian sport of bocce is also played there.

Gallery

See also

Cadillac Center Detroit People Mover station
Detroit International Riverfront
Grand Circus Park Historic District

References

Further reading

External links

Official Campus Martius Park website
Detroit News: Campus Martius Park history
Video review of the park with on-site footage
MAPDETROIT.COM

Parks in Detroit
Downtown Detroit
Culture of Detroit
History of Detroit
Kilometre-zero markers
2004 establishments in Michigan